Harold "Frog" Fagan (November 3, 1940 – August 6, 1993) was a NASCAR Winston Cup driver from the Toronto subdivision of Willowdale, Ontario, Canada.

History
Harold Fagan is the son of Mrs. Yvonne Fagan (who was the owner of the Northway Restaurant on Yonge Street north of Sheppard). Fagan served his country in the Royal Canadian Navy and would go to his mother's restaurant while on shore leave. His mother's 1957 Dodge Custom Royal would be Fagan's first ride; he would punch some holes in the muffler to make it sound better. Pinecrest Speedway was Fagan's first ever experience racing stock cars at any level.

He had one top-ten finish (eighth at the 1968 Fireball 300 race that took place at the Asheville-Weaverville Speedway in Weaverville, North Carolina). His monetary achievement was earning $6,305 ($ when adjusted for inflation) in total career earnings. On average, Fagan started his races in 28th place and finished them in 23rd place. Fagan's career stretched for four years and twenty races. The majority of Fagan's races were driven in Ford vehicles; most notably in the #95 entry owned by Neil Castles while also racing in the #77 entry driven during his rookie season in 1967. Other manufacturers that Fagan raced for included Dodge (with the #06 entry)

References

1940 births
1993 deaths
Racing drivers from Ontario
NASCAR drivers
People from Willowdale, Toronto
Sportspeople from North York